See Diocese of Derry and Raphoe for the Anglican (Church of Ireland) counterpart

The Diocese of Raphoe is a Latin Church ecclesiastical territory or diocese of the Catholic Church in County Donegal in Ulster, Ireland. It is one of eight suffragan dioceses in the inter-Irish primatial ecclesiastical province of the metropolitan Archdiocese of Armagh.
 
On 9 June 2017, Alan McGuckian was appointed Bishop of Raphoe and was ordained to the episcopate on 5 August 2017.

 History 
 Established circa 700 as Abbacy nullius of Raphoe / Rapoten(sis) (Latin)
 Promoted in 1111 as Diocese of Raphoe / Rapoten(sis) (Latin).

 Statistics and Geographic remit
The bishopric covers most of County Donegal apart from the Inishowen peninsula. The largest towns are Ballyshannon, Donegal, Letterkenny and Stranorlar. As per 2014 it pastorally served 82,600 Catholics (91.1% of 90,700 total) on 4,030 km² (1555 sq. mi.) in 33 parishes with 85 priests (83 diocesan, 2 religious), 48 lay religious (4 brothers, 44 sisters) and 5 seminarians.

The bishop's residence – Ard Adomnán – is in the town of Letterkenny. It is located beside the Parochial House, near the  Cathedral of St Eunan and St Columba which is dedicated to the joint patrons of the diocese – Saints Eunan (also known as Adomnán) and Columba (also known as Columcille).
The former Cathedral, once Cathedral of St Eunan, also in Raphoe, is now a Protestant church.

Episcopal ordinariesAbbots Nullius of Raphoe not available ?Suffragan Bishops of Raphoe ... first incumbent(s) unavailable ? 
 Gilla in Choimded Ua Caráin (Gilbert O’Caran) (1156?–1175), next Metropolitan Archbishop of Armagh (Northern Ireland) (1175 – death 1180)
 Máel Pátraic Ó Scannail (Patrick O’Scanlan), Dominican Order (O.P.) (1253.10 – 1261.11.05), next Metropolitan Archbishop of Armagh (Northern Ireland) (1261.11.05 – death 1270.03.16)
 Giovanni de Alneto, Friars Minor (O.F.M.) (1263.12.03 – 1265.04.28)
 Cairpre Ó Scuapa (1265 – death 1274)
 Fergal Ó Firghil (Florentius O’Ferrell) (1275 – death 1299)
 Énri Mac in Chrossáin (Henricus) (1306 – death 1319)
 Tomás Mac Carmaic Uí Domnaill (1319 – death 1337)
 Pádraig Mac Maonghaill (? – death 1367)
 Conchobhar Mac Carmaic Uí Dhomhnaill (Cornelius) (1367.12.23 – retired 1397.02.21), died 1399 
 Seoán Mac Meanmain, Cistercian Order (O. Cist.) (1397.02.21 – ?)
 Eóin Mac Carmaic (Johannes) (1400 – death 1419)
 Lochlainn Ó Gallchobhair (Laurentius) (1420.02.28 – death 1438)
 Cornelius Mac Giolla Bhrighde (1440.07.20 – death 1442)
 Lochlainn Ó Gallchobhair (Laurentius) (1442.06.18 – death 1479)
 Johannes de Rogeriis (1479.11.12 – death 1482)
 Meanma Mac Carmaic (Menelaus Mac Carmacáin) (1482.11.04 – retired 1514.02.06), died 1515
 Cornelius O’Cahan (Conn Ó Cathláin) (1514.02.06 – retired 1534), died ?1550
 Edmund O’Gallagher (Éamonn Ó Gallchobhair) (1534.05.11 – death 1543.02.26)
 Art O’Gallagher (1547.12.05 – death 1561.08.13)
 Donald MacGongail (Donald McGonagle) (1562.01.28 – death 1589.09.29)
 Niall O’Boyle (1591.08.09 – death 1611.02.06)
 John O’Cullenan (1625.06.09 – death 1661.03.24)Apostolic Administrator Fergus Laurence Lea (1694.02.18 – death 1696), while Bishop of Derry (Northern Ireland) (1694.02.08 – 1696 not possessed)
 
 ...
 
 James O'Gallagher (1725–1737)
 Daniel O'Gallagher, Franciscan Order (O.F.M.) (1737–1749)
 Anthony O'Donnell, O.F.M. (1750–1755)
 Nathaniel O'Donnell (1755–1758)
 Philip O'Reilly (1759–1782)
 Anthony Coyle (1782–1801), previously Coadjutor Bishop: Anthony Coyle (1777.04.27 – 1782)
 Coadjutor Bishop: Fr. John McElvoy (1801.01.30 – 1801.09.20)
 Peter McLaughlin (1802–1819)
 Patrick McGettigan (1820–1861)
 Daniel McGettigan (1861–1870), previously Coadjutor Bishop: Daniel McGettigan (later Archbishop) (1856.02.29 – 1861.05.01)
 James McDevitt (1871–1879)
 Michael Logue (1879–1887)
 Patrick O'Donnell (1888–1922)
 William MacNeely (1923–1963)
 Anthony Columba McFeely (1965–1982)
 Séamus Hegarty (1982–1994)
 Philip Boyce, Discalced Carmelites (O.C.D.) (1995– 2017.06.09)
 Alan McGuckian, Jesuit Order (S.J.) (2017.06.09 – ...)

See also 
 Catholic Church in Ireland
 List of Catholic dioceses in Ireland
 Sexual abuse scandal in Raphoe diocese
 Anglican counterpart Diocese of Derry and Raphoe (Church of Ireland)

References

External links
 Diocese of Raphoe (Official website)
 GCatholic.org, with Google map – data for all sections
 Diocese of Raphoe (Irish Catholic Bishops' Conference)
 Diocese of Raphoe (Catholic-Hierarchy website)
 Raphoe: Profile of the diocese (CatholicCity.com, from Catholic Encyclopedia)

 
1111 establishments in Ireland
Roman Catholic Diocese
Religion in County Donegal
Roman Catholic dioceses established in the 12th century
Roman Catholic dioceses in Ireland
Roman Catholic Ecclesiastical Province of Armagh